The Mycetophilidae are a family of small flies, forming the bulk of those species known as fungus gnats. About 3000 described species are placed in 150 genera, but the true number of species is undoubtedly much higher. They are generally found in the damp habitats favoured by their host fungi and sometimes form dense swarms.

Adults of this family can usually be separated from other small flies by the strongly humped thorax, well-developed coxae, and often spinose legs, but identification within the family between genera and species generally requires close study of microscopic features such as subtle differences in wing venation and variation in chaetotaxy and genitalia. The terrestrial larvae usually feed on fungi, especially the fruiting bodies, but also spores and hyphae, but some species have been recorded on mosses and liverworts. The larvae of some species, while still being associated with fungi, are at least partly predatory. Some species are attracted to the fungus smell of Jack-in-the-Pulpit, fall into their inflorescences and accomplish their pollination.

Description 
Adult mosquitoes sometimes gather in great numbers in various hiding places, under tree roots and holes, and in general they are the most common insects in our forests. However, due to their small size and inconspicuous coloration, they are rarely known or noticed. On the other hand, the larvae of mushroom eaters are known to all, since they form the main population of mushrooms with worms. In addition to the fruiting bodies of cap mushrooms, they also inhabit wood fungi and can be found under the bark of decaying trees. The diet of most larvae is exclusively fungal, but some members of this family are predators. Adults do not cause damage to plants, but lay 2 small eggs on the surface of moist soil (5-8 cm). Larvae, translucent, legless worms with a black "head" measuring 8-10 mm, later emerge from the eggs. The mouthparts are gnawing. The larvae usually develop in soil on decaying plant tissue. However, under indoor conditions they often lack feeding substratum, so they gnaw at tender young roots and underground shoots of plants. This is the main hazard. The occurrence of large numbers of fungal mosquitoes in the garden will lead to an exponential increase in larval numbers, which in turn will result in root damage that leads to yellowing of leaves, loss of energy to the plant and often a significant reduction in garden productivity.
 
The larvae can also be carriers of diseases that infect plants, in some cases resulting in a total loss of crops. Although fungus mosquitoes are generally more of an annoyance than a threat, their presence should be taken seriously and measures to control and eliminate this pest should be started as soon as possible after detection.

Bioluminescence

Around a dozen mycetophilid species are unique among flies in displaying bioluminescence. In some species, this is restricted to the larval stage, but in others this feature is retained by the pupae and adults. The ability to produce their own light may be used by some predatory larvae as a lure for potential prey, although it also obviously makes them more susceptible to predation or parasitism. These are not mycetophilids sensu stricto, but belong to the family Keroplatidae.

Fossil record
Mycetophilids, including some extant genera, are well represented in amber deposits and the group appears to have been well established and diversified by the Cretaceous period at the latest.

Taxonomy
Some 800 species (including some of the bioluminescent species) have been split into a separate family by Tuomikoski in 1966, Keroplatidae. This split is not universally recognized as yet, and many sources still include the keroplatid genera within the Mycetophilidae. Other recent families, included here in Mycetophilidae as they are not recognized by all workers are Ditomyiidae, Lygistorrhinidae, Diadocidiidae, and Rangomaramidae. The Mycetophilidae sensu lato contain about 330 described genera. These include:

Acnemia Meigen, 1818
Acomopterella Zaitzev, 1989
Acrodicrania Skuse, 1888
Adicroneura Vockeroth, 1980
Afrocnemia Matile, 1998
Agaromya Rondani, 1861
Aglaomyia Vockeroth, 1980
Alavamanota Blagoderov & Arillo, 2002
Allactoneura Meijere, 1907
Allocotocera Mik, 1886
Allodia Winnertz, 1863
Allodiopsis Tuomikoski, 1966
Anaclileia Meunier, 1904
Anatella Winnertz, 1863
Aneura Marshall, 1896
Anomalomyia Hutton, 1904
Aphrastomyia Coher & Lane, 1949
Apolephthisa Grzegorzek, 1885
Archaeboletina Meunier, 1904
Armbrusteleia Evenhuis, 1994
Aspidionia Colless, 1966
Atalosciophila Ren, 1995
Ateleia Skuse, 1888
Austrosciophila Tonnoir, 1929
Austrosynapha Tonnoir, 1929
Aysenmyia Duret, 1979
Azana Walker, 1856
Baeopterogyna Vockeroth, 1972
Baisodicrana Blagoderov, 1995
Boletina Staeger, 1840
Boletiniella Matile, 1973
Bolithomya Rondani, 1856
Boraceomyia Lane, 1948
Brachydicrania Skuse, 1888
Brachypeza Winnertz, 1863
Brachyradia Ševcík & Kjaerandsen, 2012
Brevicornu Marshall, 1896
Caledonileia Matile, 1993
Callicypta Lane, 1954
Cawthronia Tonnoir & Edwards, 1927
Celebesomyia Saigusa, 1973
Chalastonepsia Søli, 1996
Clastobasis Skuse, 1890
Cluzobra Edwards, 1940
Coelophthinia Edwards, 1941
Coelosia Winnertz, 1863
Cordyla Meigen, 1803
Cowanomyia Jaschhof & Jaschhof, 2009
Creagdhubhia Chandler, 1999
Cycloneura Marshall, 1896
Deimyia Kallweit, 2002:
Dianepsia Loew, 1850
Dinempheria Matile, 1979
Disparoleia Blagoderov & Grimaldi, 2004
Docosia Winnertz, 1863
Dongbeimyceta Hong, 2002
Drepanorzeckia Blagoderov, 1997
Duretophragma Borkent, 2013
Dynatosoma Winnertz, 1863
Echinopodium Freeman, 1951
Ectrepesthoneura Enderlein, 1910
Ekhiritus Blagoderov, 1995
Eoexechia Camier & Nel, 2020
Eomyceta Hong, 2002
Eosciophila Hong, 1974
Epicypta Winnertz, 1863
Eudicrana Loew,  187
Eumanota Edwards, 1933
Exechia Winnertz, 1863
Exechiites Blagoderov, 2000
Exechiopsis Tuomikoski, 1966
Fushunoboleta Hong, 2002
Gaalomyia Blagoderov & Grimaldi, 2004
Garrettella Vockeroth, 1980
Gnoriste Meigen, 1818
Gracilileia Matile, 1993
Greenomyia Brunetti, 1912
Gregikia Blagoderov & Grimaldi, 2004
Grzegorzekia Edwards, 1941
Hadroneura Lundström, 1906
Hemisphaeronotus Saigusa, 2007
Hemolia Blagoderov & Grimaldi, 2004
Impleta Plassmann, 1978
Indoleia Edwards, 1928
Ipsaneusidalys Blagoderov, 1998
Izleiina Blagoderov & Grimaldi, 2004
Jugazana Coher, 1995
Katatopygia Martinsson & Kjaerandsen, 2012
Lecadonileia Blagoderov & Grimaldi, 2004
Leia Meigen, 1818
Leiella Enderlein, 1910
Leptomorphus Curtis, 1831
Loewiella Meunier, 1894
Lusitanoneura Ribeiro & Chandler, 2007
Macrobrachius
Macrocera
Macrorrhyncha
Manota
Megalopelma
Megophthalmidia
Micromacrocera
Monoclona
Morganiella
Mycetophila
Mycomya
Myrosia
Neoallocotocera
Neoaphelomera
Neoclastobasis
Neoempheria
Neotrizygia
Neuratelia
Notolopha
Novakia
Orfelia

Palaeodocosia
Paleoplatyura
Paracycloneura

Paraleia
Paramorganiella
Paratinia
Paratrizygia
Parvicellula
Phoenikiella
Phronia
Phthinia
Platurocypta
Platyura
Polylepta
Pseudalysiina
Pseudexechia
Pseudobrachypeza
Pseudorymosia
Rondaniella
Rymosia
Saigusaia
Sceptonia
Sciophila
Sigmoleia
Speolepta
Stenophragma
Sticholeia
Stigmatomeria
Symmerus
Synapha
Synplasta
Syntemna
Tarnania
Tasmanina
Taxicnemis
Tetragoneura
Trichonta
Trichoterga
Trizygia
Xenoplatyura
Zygomyia
Zygophronia

Gallery

Catalogues
Evenhuis, N. L. 2006. Catalog of the Keroplatidae of the World (Insecta: Diptera). Bishop Museum Bulletin in Entomology 13. Bishop Museum Press, Honolulu. 1–178.Online here

References

External links

Fungus Gnats Online
Diptera.info Images

 
Bioluminescent insects
Keroplatidae
Nematocera families
Taxa named by Edward Newman
Articles containing video clips